Richard Leaf (born 1 January 1967) is an English actor.

He has had several small parts in television and stage productions. Leaf met actress Tamsin Greig at a wrap party after Neil Gaiman's 1996 miniseries Neverwhere finished recording. They married in 1997 and they have three children.  The actor is notable for his role as the Duke of York, nephew of King Edward I in Mel Gibson's Braveheart. He appeared as Hannibal Lecter's father in the 2007 film Hannibal Rising. He also appeared as John Dawlish, an Auror, in the film Harry Potter and the Order of the Phoenix, and portrayed Jack, the bartender of the Cloverdilly public house, in the 2006 film, Penelope.

Filmography

External links

References

1967 births
Place of birth missing (living people)
Living people
20th-century English male actors
21st-century English male actors
English male film actors
English male stage actors
English male television actors